The 1991 French Open was a tennis tournament that took place on the outdoor clay courts at the Stade Roland Garros in Paris, France. The tournament was held from 27 May until 9 June. It was the 95th staging of the French Open, and the second Grand Slam tennis event of 1991.

Seniors

Men's singles

 Jim Courier defeated  Andre Agassi, 3–6, 6–4, 2–6, 6–1, 6–4
 It was Courier's third title of the year, and his fourth overall. It was his first career Grand Slam title.

Women's singles

 Monica Seles defeated  Arantxa Sánchez Vicario, 6–3, 6–4
 It was Seles's 4th title of the year, and her 14th overall. It was her 3rd career Grand Slam title, and her 2nd French Open title.

Men's doubles

 John Fitzgerald /  Anders Järryd defeated  Rick Leach /  Jim Pugh, 6–0, 7–6

Women's doubles

 Gigi Fernández /  Jana Novotná defeated  Larisa Savchenko Neiland /  Natalia Zvereva, 6–4, 6–0

Mixed doubles

 Helena Suková /  Cyril Suk defeated  Caroline Vis /  Paul Haarhuis, 3–6, 6–4, 6–1

Juniors

Boys' singles
 Andrei Medvedev defeated  Thomas Enqvist, 6–4, 7–6

Girls' singles
 Anna Smashnova defeated  Inés Gorrochategui, 2–6, 7–5, 6–1

Boys' doubles
 Thomas Enqvist /  Magnus Martinelle defeated  Julian Knowle /  Johannes Unterberger, 6–1, 6–3

Girls' doubles
 Eva Bes /  Inés Gorrochategui defeated  Zdeňka Málková /  Eva Martincová, 6–1, 6–3

Notes

External links
 Official website

 
1991 in French tennis
1991 in Paris